A clearing account is usually a temporary account containing costs or amounts that are to be transferred to another account. An example is the income summary account containing revenue and expense amounts to be transferred to retained earnings at the close of a fiscal period.

Other example of clearing account is excise clearing account.

References

Accounting terminology